Kotrag was according to Nikephoros I of Constantinople a son of Kubrat of the Dulo clan of Bulgars. Following the death of his father, he began to extend the influence of his Bulgars to the Volga River. He is remembered as the founder of Volga Bulgaria.

Honour

 Kotrag Nunatak on Greenwich Island in the South Shetland Islands, Antarctica is named after Kotrag.
 In the Republic of Chuvashia in the village of Shemursha on June 12, 2022, a monument was erected to the founder of the Volga Bulgaria - Kotrag
 On January 12, 2023, a monument to the founder of Volga Bulgaria, Khan Kotrag, was erected in Shiryaev on Popova Hill. The monument was made by the famous Bulgarian sculptor Dishko Dishkov. The official opening of the monument to Khan Kotrag is scheduled for spring.

Name 
The possible origin of the name of khan Kotrag from the Chuvash name Kătrak and Kătrashka, which in translation means Curly, a common pre-Christian name among the Chuvash. In the Kipchak languages, the word Curly is translated as tat. Bodrә (Бөдрә) on kaz.Buyra (Бұйра). Perhaps the name Kotrag was given in honor of the great-grandfather Kobrat, who also bore the name Kotrag in honor of whom the whole tribe of Kutrigurs was named.
Procopius also recorded a genealogical legend according to which:...in the old days many Huns, called then Cimmerians, inhabited the lands I mentioned already. They all had a single king. Once one of their kings had two sons: one called Uti oghur and another called Kutri oghur. After their father's death they shared the power and gave their names to the subjected peoples, so that even nowadays some of them are called Utigurs and the others - Kutrigurs.Many researchers of Chuvash history note a common name before christian chuvash as Kutri (chu.Kăтри) - which means Curly, perhaps this name is also reflected in Procopius.

Gallery

References

Dulo clan